Perissoneura chrysea is a species of caddisfly in the genus Perissoneura of the family Odontoceridae.

References

Trichoptera